The Melrose Public Library is a historic library at 69 W. Emerson Street in Melrose, Massachusetts.  The original T-shaped building was built in 1904, and is a two-story Colonial Revival structure faced in brick with limestone trim.  It was built with funds contributed by philanthropist Andrew Carnegie to a design by Lynn architect Penn Varney, and features stained glass windows by Wilbur H. Burnham.  A modern single story addition was added in 1963 to the rear and left side of the building.

The building was listed on the National Register of Historic Places in 1988.

The Library is a member of the North of Boston Library Exchange (NOBLE) consortium.

Resource collections 

 General (fiction, nonfiction, reference materials, serials, etc.)
 Children's library
 Teen Zone
 Digital library
 Seed library

Other services 

 Computer stations
 Wi-fi
 Printing
 Museum passes 
 Room reservations for non-profit, educational, civic, or cultural groups

See also
National Register of Historic Places listings in Middlesex County, Massachusetts

References

External links

Official Website

Library buildings completed in 1904
Public libraries in Massachusetts
Carnegie libraries in Massachusetts
Buildings and structures in Melrose, Massachusetts
Libraries on the National Register of Historic Places in Massachusetts
Libraries in Middlesex County, Massachusetts
National Register of Historic Places in Middlesex County, Massachusetts